Helmick is an unincorporated community in Coshocton County, in the U.S. state of Ohio.

History
A post office called Helmick was in operation between 1862 and 1925. The community was named for William Helmick (1817–1888), a U.S. Representative from Ohio.

References

Unincorporated communities in Coshocton County, Ohio
1862 establishments in Ohio
Unincorporated communities in Ohio